James MacLean may refer to:
 James MacLean (priest), Canadian Anglican priest
 James R. MacLean, merchant, notary public and political figure in Prince Edward Island
 James Noël MacKenzie MacLean, Scottish historian and author
 James Mackenzie Maclean, British journalist and politician
 James MacLaine, occasionally MacLean, Irish highwayman in London

See also
 James McLean (disambiguation)